Ljubljanica is a river in the southern part of the Ljubljana Basin, Slovenia.

Ljubljanica may also refer to:

Slovenia

 Ljubljanica (creek), a creek in Velika Loka, Grosuplje
 Ljubljanica, Butajnova, a hamlet in the village of Butajnova
 Ljubljanica, Stomaž, a hamlet in the village of Stomaž, Ajdovščina
 Ljubljanica, Žalna, a hamlet in the village of Žalna

Croatia
 Ljubljanica, Sisak-Moslavina County, a settlement near Martinska Ves
 Ljubljanica, Zagreb, a neighbourhood of Zagreb